The Trouble with Romance is a 2007 comedy-drama film directed by Gene Rhee and starring Kip Pardue, David Eigenberg, Roger Fan, Josie Davis, Sheetal Sheth, and Coby Ryan McLaughlin.

External links
 

2007 films
2007 comedy-drama films
American comedy-drama films
2007 comedy films
2007 drama films
2000s English-language films
2000s American films